Angelique Burgos (also known as La Burbu, born December 17, 1978) is a broadcaster and actress.  She was a model for the show No te Duermas ("Don't Fall Asleep") a few years back,  and was the winner of the reality show "Las Estrellas Bailan" in Pa' Que Te Lo Goces on a Puerto Rico television show.  She is currently the host of a TV show called 'Pegate al Mediodia' on Wapa TV and 'El Despelote' on the radio with Roque Gallart in La Nueva 94 (SBS) both shows are aired Monday to Friday.

She released a book, Un grito de silencio in 2009, which describes her experience of being raped as a young child, in an effort to help other victims of abuse.

She is married to basketball player Elías Larry Ayuso. They have two kids together, Saílh Elías also known as Red Red was born on August 22, 2011, and Kokoh Mar who was born on September 28, 2017.

See also

Taína

References

People from Fajardo, Puerto Rico
Puerto Rican female models
Puerto Rican television personalities
1978 births
Living people
21st-century American women